The Jejora is a river in Racha region of Georgia. It is a left tributary of the Rioni. It originates in South Ossetia in the Dvaleti section of the main watershed of the Greater Caucasus, 2975 m above sea level and flows in a western direction. South of the river valley rises the  mountains  of the Racha Range. It joins the Rioni at Oni town.

References

Rivers of Georgia (country)